Lake Florence is a small lake  southwest of I-95 in Brevard County, Florida. It is at the end of Tucker Lane, where a primitive boat ramp abuts the lake. This lake has no park areas or public swimming beaches.

References

Lakes of Brevard County, Florida